Willard Lewis Tibbetts, Jr. (March 26, 1903 - March 28, 1992) was an American athlete who competed mainly in the 3000 metre team.  Tibbetts grew up in Stafford Springs, Connecticut.  He graduated from Worcester Academy in 1922 and matriculated to Harvard.

He competed for the United States in the 1924 Summer Olympics held in Paris, France in the 3000 metre team where he won the bronze medal with his team mates Edward Kirby and William Cox.

References

External links
 

American male long-distance runners
Olympic bronze medalists for the United States in track and field
Athletes (track and field) at the 1924 Summer Olympics
1903 births
1992 deaths
Medalists at the 1924 Summer Olympics
Harvard Crimson men's track and field athletes
People from Stafford Springs, Connecticut
Worcester Academy alumni